Pascal Sieber (born 29 April 1977 in St. Gallen, Switzerland) is a Swiss curler.

He played on the 2006 Winter Olympics where Swiss men's team finished on fifth place.

Teams

References

External links
 
 

Living people
1977 births
Sportspeople from St. Gallen (city)
Swiss male curlers
Swiss curling champions
Olympic curlers of Switzerland
Curlers at the 2006 Winter Olympics
21st-century Swiss people